Nick Marsman (born 1 October 1990) is a Dutch professional footballer who plays as a goalkeeper for MLS side Inter Miami.

Club career
Born in Zwolle, Marsman has played for FC Twente and Go Ahead Eagles.

In June 2017 he signed a one-year contract at FC Utrecht.

On 20 June 2019, Feyenoord announced that they had reached a principal agreement for a two-year contract with Marsman. On 1 December 2019, Marsman played his first Eredivisie match with Feyenoord against PEC Zwolle, keeping a clean sheet as his side were victorious 1–0. He was awarded the Man of the Match title by his club.

In April 2021 it was announced that he would sign for MLS side Inter Miami CF in July.

International career
Marsman represented Netherlands national under-21 team at the 2012 Toulon Tournament.

Honours

Club
Twente
Johan Cruijff Schaal: 2010

References

External links
 

1990 births
Living people
Sportspeople from Zwolle
Association football goalkeepers
Dutch footballers
Netherlands youth international footballers
Netherlands under-21 international footballers
FC Twente players
Go Ahead Eagles players
FC Utrecht players
Feyenoord players
Eredivisie players
Eerste Divisie players
Footballers from Overijssel
Inter Miami CF players
Inter Miami CF II players
Dutch expatriate footballers
Dutch expatriate sportspeople in the United States
Expatriate soccer players in the United States
Major League Soccer players
Jong FC Twente players
MLS Next Pro players